Ride or Die, also known as Hustle and Heat, is a 2003 crime drama film written by Duane Martin, who stars in the film and Jay Wolcott. The film was directed by Craig Ross, Jr. In addition to Martin, the cast includes Vivica A. Fox and Meagan Good.

Plot
Conrad "Rad" McRae (Duane Martin) is a private investigator who is on the trail of the man who murdered his lifelong friend, Benjamin (Jadakiss), an up-and-coming rapper. Weapons expert Lisa (Vivica A. Fox) partners with McRae and assists him in his quest for justice. At the center of his investigation is Benjamin's former producer, "B-Free" (Michael Taliferro), who controls quite a powerful business that often deals in illegal activities.

Cast

References

External links
 

2003 films
2003 crime drama films
African-American films
Hood films
American crime drama films
2000s English-language films
2000s American films